The 2008–09 Kansas Jayhawks men's basketball team represented the University of Kansas in the 2008–09 NCAA Division I men's basketball season, the Jayhawks' 111th basketball season. The head coach was Bill Self, serving his 6th year. The team played its home games in Allen Fieldhouse in Lawrence, Kansas, and were the defending National Champions. The AP poll released on January 26, 2009, had the Jayhawks unranked, which was the last poll in which the Jayhawks were not ranked until February 8, 2021. The following week, Kansas entered the rankings at number 21, beginning what is the longest streak in Men’s Basketball history with 223 consecutive polls being ranked and achieved that record on November 30, 2020. They are 2 ahead of UCLA’s 221 straight weeks that was done from 1967-1980.

Pre-Season 
The 2007–08 Jayhawks finished the season 37–3 overall with a 13–3 mark in conference play.  They won the Big 12 regular season men's basketball championship, which they shared with the Texas Longhorns.  In post season play, the Jayhawks won the Big 12 conference tournament championship and received a No. 1 seed in the NCAA tournament. The team went on to win the national championship, 75–68, in overtime vs. the Memphis Tigers. The Jayhawks finished the season #1 in the final Coaches Poll after the tournament and were ranked 5th in the final AP Poll before the tournament.  The team raised a temporary NCAA Men's Division I Basketball Championship banner to the rafters in an official ceremony to celebrate its 2008 NCAA Division I men's basketball tournament victory during Late Night in the Phog event. The official championship and final four banners were raised during the November 18 game against Florida Gulf Coast.

The Jayhawks lost five scholarship seniors from their national title team in addition to three underclassmen (Brandon Rush, Mario Chalmers, and Darrell Arthur) who opted to enter the NBA draft and eventually signed with agents.  Returning from the national championship team are stars Sherron Collins, point guard, and Cole Aldrich, center.  Other players returning are: seniors Matt Kleinmann and Brennan Bechard, and sophomores Brady Morningstar, Chase Buford, Tyrel Reed, and Connor Teahan.

Recruiting 
Coach Self signed seven recruits for the 2008–09 season. The class was led by New Jersey twins Marcus and Markieff Morris who both played the power forward position. Another signee from New Jersey was Quintrell Thomas, who also played the power forward position.  Travis Releford, a Kansas City product was the first signee for the Jayhawks and was in the mix for departed star Brandon Rush's spot in the starting rotation. Coach Self also managed to lure point guard Tyshawn Taylor to Lawrence, after he was released from his letter of intent to play for Marquette.  The Jayhawks also signed junior college transfers Tyrone Appleton and Mario Little.

Season summary 
Kansas finished the regular season 25–6 (14–2). After being picked to tie for 3rd in the conference in preseason, the Jayhawks defied expectations and won their 5th straight Big 12 conference championship and 52nd overall.

Awards
 Bill Self
Big 12 Coach of the Year
AP Coach of the Year
USBWA Coach of the Year (Henry Iba Award).
Sporting News Coach of the Year
Athlon Sports Coach of the Year
USBWA District VI Coach of the Year
Yahoo Sports Coach of the Year
CBS/Chevrolet Coach of the Year
ESPN Coach of the Year
 Cole Aldrich
All-Big 12 First Team
Big 12 All-Defensive Team
Big 12 Defensive Co-Player of the Year
Big 12 All-Academic Team
AP All-American Honorable Mention
Athlon Sports National Most Improved Player of the Year
NABC District 8 First Team
USBWA All-District VI Team
NCAA Tournament All-Midwest Regional Team
 Sherron Collins
All-Big 12 First Team (unanimous selection)
AP All-American Third Team
CBSSports.com All-American Third Team
Sporting News Third Team All-American
USBWA All-District VI Team
USBWA Second Team All-American.
NABC District 8 First Team
Finalist, Oscar Robertson Trophy
Finalist, Bob Cousy Award
 Marcus Morris
Big 12 All-Rookie Team
 Tyshawn Taylor
Big 12 All-Rookie Team (unanimous selection)
 Tyrel Reed
Big 12 All-Academic Team
 Matt Kleinmann
Big 12 All-Academic Team

Roster

Schedule 

|-
!colspan=12 style=|Summer Canadian Exhibition Games

|-
!colspan=12 style=|Exhibition

|-
!colspan=12 style=|Regular season

|-
!colspan=12 style=|Big 12 Tournament 

|-
!colspan=12 style=|NCAA Tournament

Rankings

References 

 http://rivalshoops.rivals.com/commitlist.asp?Year=2008&Sport=2&School=33

Kansas Jayhawks men's basketball seasons
Kansas
Kansas
Jay
Jay